Waen Origen Shepherd (born 23 October 1971) is an English composer, actor and comedian. He is best known for his role in The  inbetweeners as Mr Kennedy . He is  Originally from Yorkshire, England, he now lives in London.

Career
Following his days as a stand-up poet and fringe actor, Shepherd started out performing bizarre experimental monologues at the early Cluub Zarathustra, touring with spoof techno band and Edinburgh sell-out The Pod with fellow comedian/musicians Tim Hope and Julian Barratt. He hosted the underground cabaret Gritty Fingers and smashed up Cornish pasties in the guise of ranting Northern madman William Whicker.

He graduated from Oxford University in 1993, with a degree in Philosophy and Psychology.

He went on to co-write and narrate award-winning animation The Wolfman (screened on Channel 4 and subsequently worked into an advertisement for the Sony PlayStation), before writing, directing and starring in his own animation Origen's Wake for Channel 4's Comedy Lab series.

Since then, Shepherd concentrated on developing a number of comedy characters on stage, partly through his work as one half of Shepherd & Farnaby in their shows Animal Pie and Peterford Golf Club, and partly through his solo work on the comedy circuit.

In 2003, Shepherd created a deluded monster in the form of Gary Le Strange, melding his love of composing with that of creating original comedy characters. He went on to win the Perrier Award Best Newcomer (2003) for that debut performance. He achieved cult success, hosting a "Club Le Strange" comedy evening at The Albany in London.

Shepherd enjoys portraying exaggerated or absurd characters, and appeared in two series of BBC2's science fiction comedy, Hyperdrive, as Captain Helix. He has also appeared on BBC Radio 2's Out to Lunch programme.

In 2007, Shepherd appeared in a short film by Tim Plester entitled World of Wrestling, in which he played 'Exotic' Adrian Street, a wrestler with the flamboyance of a drag queen. He also has had two roles in Series 1 of We Are Klang as 'The Juggler' and a Hungarian prince. Shepherd played the role of peadophillic teacher, Mr. Kennedy, in the award-winning second and third series of The Inbetweeners.

Shepherd was cited as one of the Top 50 British comedians by The Times and he is included as one of the Top 50 Cult Comedian Icons in the Rough Guide series of books. Shepherd's dedication to British comedy has been honoured by the inclusion of his name on the famous Comedy Carpet at Blackpool, under the guise of Gary Le Strange.

Shepherd has written several theme tunes and music for television and radio. He is the series composer for Crackanory and Murder in Successville, both produced by Tiger Aspect. He has composed music for several films, including the 2015 feature-film The Ghoul directed by Gareth Tunley.

Albums 
Polaroid Suitcase
Face Academy
Glamoronica
Beef Scarecrow

TV credits 
Action Team – Series 1 (Shinny Button/ITV) – Series Composer
Murder in Successville – Series 1,2 & 3 (Tiger Aspect/BBC) – Series Composer
Crackanory – Series 1 - 4 (Tiger Aspect/UKTV) – Series Composer
Count Arthur Strong – Series 1 (BBC) – 2013 Victorian Policeman
The Inbetweeners – Series 2 (Channel 4) – 2009 John "Paedo" Kennedy
The Inbetweeners – Series 3 (Channel 4) – 2010 John "Paedo" Kennedy
We Are Klang – 2009 Hungarian Prince
We Are Klang – 2009 The Juggler
Hyperdrive Series Two (BBC2) – 2007 Captain Helix
Comedy Cuts (ITV2 ) – 2007 Gary Le Strange
World Stands Up (BBC America – 2006
Hyperdrive Series One  – BBC2 – 2006 Captain Helix
Gary Le Strange (BBC)
Comedy Lab: Origen's Wake (Channel 4) actor, writer, composer, director
PS2 "Third place" advert, actor/writer
The Wolfman (C4) actor/writer
Comedy Nation (BBC2) actor/writer
The Net (BBC2)
London Shouting (BBC2)

Film credits 
The Ghoul (Gareth Tunley, 2017) - composer
Aaaaaaaah! (Lincoln Studios, 2015)
The Monster (Bob Pipe, 2015) - composer
World of Wrestling (Ben Gregor 2007)
The Incredibly Strange People Show (Powercage Films, 2001)

Radio credits 
2525 (BBC Radio 4)
Tittle Tattle (BBC Radio 2)
Alice's Wunderland (BBC Radio 4)
Lucy Montgomery's Variety Pack (BBC Radio 2)
Danny Robins' Music Therapy (BBC Radio 4) - composer
Play & Record (BBC Radio 7)
Out to Lunch (BBC Radio 2)
The Day The Music Died (BBC Radio 2)
4 at the Store (BBC Radio 4)
The End of the Road Show (BBC Radio 4)

References

External links

Gary Le Strange website

1971 births
Living people
English male comedians
Alumni of Oriel College, Oxford
English stand-up comedians
British LGBT comedians
British LGBT broadcasters
English LGBT people
British comedy musicians
British composers